Sylvania (Latin for "forest land" or "woods") may refer to:

Companies trading as Sylvania 
 Sylvania Electric Products, a former major American diversified electrical and electronics manufacturer
 Sylvania (brand), its Canadian lighting products division which continues to license to both Havells Sylvania and Osram Sylvania
 Osram Sylvania, an American lighting manufacturer owned by Osram AG of Germany
 Havells Sylvania, an international lighting manufacturer owned by Shanghai Feilo Acoustics Ltd

Education 
 Sylvania City School District, in Northwest Ohio, United States
 Sylvania High School, in Sydney, New South Wales, Australia

Places

United States 
 Sylvania, Alabama
 Sylvania, Arkansas
 Sylvania, Georgia
 Sylvania, Indiana
 Sylvania, Louisville, Kentucky
 Sylvania, Missouri
 Sylvania, Ohio
 Sylvania, Pennsylvania
 Sylvania, Wisconsin
 Mount Sylvania, in Oregon
 Sylvania Mountains, in California and Nevada
 Sylvania Township (disambiguation)
 Sylvania Wilderness, in Michigan

Other places
 Sylvania, New South Wales, a suburb of Sydney, Australia
 Sylvania, Saskatchewan, Canada

Fictional locations
 Sylvania (Warhammer), the fictitious realm of the Vampire Counts in the Warhammer Fantasy Battle game
 Sylvania, a fictional country from the movie Duck Soup (1933 film)
 Sylvania, a fictional country from the comedy film The Love Parade (1929)
 Sylvania, the fictional home of the Sylvanian Families toy line

Ships
 , an American lake freighter
 , a British ocean liner
 , various ships of the United States Navy

Other uses 
 519 Sylvania, an asteroid
 Sylvania (McCormick County, South Carolina), an historic house
 Sylvania Airport, in Wisconsin
 Sylvania Watkins (born 1985), American basketball player
 The Sylvania, an historic apartment building in Indianapolis, Indiana

See also 
 Sylvan (disambiguation)
 Sylvana (disambiguation)
 Silvania (disambiguation)
 Transylvania
 Pennsylvania
 Syldavia